Shayne Louis Smith (born December 15, 1986) is an American stand-up comedian, podcaster and vocalist for the band Painted Devils.

Life and career

Smith grew up in Fillmore, Utah. He attended Canyon View High School.
 
Shayne started performing standup comedy at Wiseguys Comedy Club in 2014. City Weekly named him the Best Alternative Comedian of 2016.

His first special Prison for Wizards was released by VidAngel's Dry Bar Comedy in March 2018. Subsequent specials "Alligator Boys and "The Animal" were both released on Youtube in 2021. Smith has also contributed an article on rollerblading to One Blade Magazine.

Smith is openly bisexual.

References

External links
 
 

American stand-up comedians
Bisexual comedians
1986 births
Living people